Sonja Lumme (born 6 October 1961, in Kristinestad) is a singer in Finland who represented her country in the Eurovision Song Contest 1985 in which she sang Eläköön elämä. She got 58 points and came 9th place overall. Lumme made further attempts to represent Finland, participating in the 1988 Finnish final and in 1989, she came fifth with "Rakkauden Laulut". Her final attempt was in 1992 with the song "Rakkauden bulevardi" which came third.

Discography 

 Pallo hallussa (1984)
 Maitoa, maitoa (1987)
 Kanavanvaihtaja (1988)
 Ilyas-Farris (1989)
 Hyvin menee, naapurit nauraa (1989)
 Helibori humpsis ja pokasaha soi (1990)
 Meitin Finland (1991)
 Bonjour kirvesvartta (1992)
 Ne halii meitin (1993)
 Tunti torvisoittoa (1994)
 Pure lenkki (1995)
 Parhaat (2000) (osittain samanlainen sisältö kuin vuonna 1989 ilmestyneessä Parhaat-kokoelmassa)
 Kun Eurojentalolla tanssittiin (2001)
 Me olemme taas (2003)

External links

1961 births
Living people
People from Kristinestad
Eurovision Song Contest entrants for Finland
Eurovision Song Contest entrants of 1985